Li Yi (about 746/748–827/829) was a poet of the Tang Dynasty.

Three of Li Yi's poems were collected in the popular anthology Three Hundred Tang Poems. However, one of his most famous poems and one which was included in most other Classical Chinese poetry anthologies was not included in the Tang 300, namely the one translated by Herbert Giles as "A cast-off favourite", written in the persona of a palace lady.

Biography 
Li Yi was born in either 746 or 748.

In 769 he passed the imperial examination, receiving his Jinshi degree.

He died in either 827 or 829.

Notes

References

Works cited

External links 
  Books of the Quan Tangshi at the Chinese Text Project that include collected poems of Li Yi:
 Book 282
 Book 283
 

Three Hundred Tang Poems poets
827 deaths
Year of birth uncertain
Poets from Gansu
People from Wuwei
8th-century Chinese poets
9th-century Chinese poets